Auyeskhan Makatayuly Kyrbasov (28 May 1937 – 3 April 2014) is one of the first ambassadors of independent Kazakhstan.

In 1993–1998 yy. he represented the Republic of Kazakhstan as an Ambassador extraordinary and plenipotentiary in Kingdom of Belgium and Kingdom of the Netherlands, as well as in the Grand Duchy of Luxembourg, he was the Chief Representative of the Republic of Kazakhstan in European Union and North Atlantic Treaty Organization (NATO). 

He is the laureate of state prize of Kazakhstan in science and technology, Honoured Artist of diplomatic service of the Republic of Kazakhstan, Honoured Worker of Kazakhstan, was awarded by Certificate of Honour of Supreme Soviet of Kazakhstan, corresponding member of Engineering Academy of the Republic of Kazakhstan, Chairman of Council "Association of Diplomats of Kazakhstan".

References

1937 births
2014 deaths
Ambassadors of Kazakhstan to Belgium
Ambassadors of Kazakhstan to Luxembourg
Kazakhstani diplomats